Freedom of religion in Korea may refer to:
Freedom of religion in South Korea
Freedom of religion in North Korea